Analyta gammalis is a species of moth of the family Crambidae. It was described by Pierre Viette in 1958 and is found in eastern Madagascar.

Its wingspan is 24 mm, with a length of the forewings of 11.5 mm.

The holotype had been collected near Ranomafana, Ifanadiana, in eastern Madagascar.

References

Moths described in 1958
Spilomelinae
Moths of Madagascar
Moths of Africa